Azawad, or Azawagh (Tuareg: Azawaɣ, or Azawad) was a short-lived unrecognised state lasting from 2012 to 2013. Azawagh (Azawaɣ) is the generic Tuareg Berber name of all Tuareg Berber areas, especially the northern half of Mali and northern and western Niger. Its independence was declared unilaterally by the National Movement for the Liberation of Azawad (MNLA) in 2012, after a Tuareg rebellion drove the Malian Army from the region.

Azawad, as claimed by the MNLA, comprises the Malian regions of Timbuktu, Kidal, Gao, as well as a part of Mopti region, encompassing about 60 percent of Mali's total land area. Azawad borders Burkina Faso to the south, Mauritania to the west and northwest, Algeria to the north and northeast, and Niger to the east and southeast, with undisputed Mali to its southwest. It straddles a portion of the Sahara and the Sahelian zone. Gao is its largest city and served as the temporary capital, while Timbuktu is the second-largest city, and was intended to be the capital by the independence forces.

On 6 April 2012, in a statement posted to its website, the MNLA declared "irrevocably" the independence of Azawad from Mali. In Gao on the same day, Bilal Ag Acherif, the secretary-general of the movement, signed the Azawadi Declaration of Independence, which also declared the MNLA as the interim administrators of Azawad until a "national authority" could be formed. The proclamation was never recognised by any foreign entity, and the MNLA's claim to have de facto control of the Azawad region was disputed by both the Malian government and Islamist insurgent groups in the Sahara. At this time, a rift was developing with the Islamists. The Economic Community of West African States, which refused to recognise Azawad and called the declaration of its independence "null and void", warned it could send troops into the disputed region in support of the Malian claim.

Tuareg military leader Moussa Ag Achara Toumane affiliated with the MSA (French: "Movement pour le Salut de l'Azawad"; English: "Movement for the Salvation of Azawad") was interviewed by the French language news outlet "TV5MONDE," during its "Le journal Afrique" or "African Journal" segment, about hostile events that occurred between the MNLA and other separatist groups against jihadi extremists in 2012. He claimed that jihadi groups, and the Ansar Dine in particular, had been in the region of Azawad for 10 years before the circumstances which led to the Azawadi Declaration of Independence. Locals had heard of their extremist views (in respect to shari'a law) then subsequently distanced themselves from the jihadis. Ag Toumane further asserted that the death of Col. Mu'ammar el Gaddafi destabilised the political landscape for Sahelians from Mali and Niger to such a degree that it was described as "disastrous." The Tuareg rebels allegedly went into a "survival mode" for 5 years after his death which were fraught with socio-political and socio-economic crises. Disorganised and unaware of moderate militias, some joined jihadi groups but left when acquainted with better options; they aimed to join movements that were "good" in nature and organised for humanitarian causes for the betterment of Azawad. When asked about the speculated alliance between the MNLA and the Ansar Dine, Ag Toumane said he "personally did not know of the alliance" and referred back to the distance Azawadi locals kept from them.

On 14 February 2013, the MNLA renounced its claim of independence for Azawad and asked the Malian government to start negotiations on its future status. The MNLA ended the ceasefire in September of the same year after government forces reportedly opened fire on unarmed protesters.

Name
According to the Scottish explorer and scientist Robert Brown, Azawad is an Arabic corruption of the Berber word Azawagh, referring to a dry river basin that covers western Niger, northeastern Mali, and southern Algeria. The name translates to "land of transhumance".

On 6 April 2012, in a statement posted to its website, the MNLA declared the independence of Azawad from Mali. In this Azawad Declaration of Independence, the name Independent State of Azawad was used. On 26 May, the MNLA and its former co-belligerent Ansar Dine announced a pact in which they would merge to form an Islamist state; according to the media the new long name of Azawad was used in this pact. But this new name is not clear – sources list several variants of it: the Islamic Republic of Azawad, the Islamic State of Azawad, the Republic of Azawad. Azawad authorities did not officially confirm any change of name. Later reports indicated the MNLA had decided to withdraw from the pact with Ansar Dine. In a new statement, dated on 9 June, the MNLA used the name State of Azawad. The MNLA produced a list of the 28 members of the Transitional Council of the State of Azawad (French: Conseil de transition de l'État de l'Azawad, CTEA) serving as a provisional government with President Bilal Ag Acherif to manage the new State of Azawad.

History

Gao, Mali and Songhay empires
The Gao Empire owes its name to the town of Gao. In the ninth century AD, it was considered to be the most powerful West African kingdom.

In the early 14th century, the southern part of the region came under the control of the Mali Empire. King Musa I peacefully annexed Timbuktu in 1324, as he returned from his famous pilgrimage to Mecca.

With the power of the Mali Empire waning in the first half of the 15th century, the area around Timbuktu became relatively autonomous, although the Maghsharan Tuareg had a dominant position. Thirty years later, the rising Songhay Empire expanded in Gao, absorbing Timbuktu in 1468 or 1469 and much of the surrounding area. The city was led, consecutively, by Sunni Ali Ber (1468–1492), Sunni Baru (1492–1493) and Askia Mohammad I (1493–1528). Sunni Ali Ber was in severe conflict with Timbuktu after its conquest.

Askia Mohammad I created a golden age for both the Songhay Empire and Timbuktu through an efficient central and regional administration that allowed sufficient leeway for the city's commercial centers to flourish. With Gao as the capital of the empire, Timbuktu enjoyed a relatively autonomous position. Merchants from Ghadames, Awjilah, and numerous other cities of North Africa gathered there to trade gold and slaves in exchange for the Saharan salt of Taghaza, and North African cloth and horses. The Askia dynasty held leadership of the empire until 1591, when internal fights weakened the dynasty's grip.

Moroccan expedition
Morocco attacked the region in 1591. The Saadi ruler of Morocco, Ahmad I al-Mansur, sent the Morisco General Judar Pasha into the area. Searching for gold, he led an expedition of 4,000 Andalusian Moriscos, 500 mercenaries and 2,500 auxiliaries, including slaves, dubbed the Arma. Following the Battle of Tondibi in a village just north of Gao, Pasha and his forces captured Gao on 30 May 1591. Pasha was born into a family of Spanish Muslims in Morocco, who were banished by the Spanish Crown following the failed Alpujarras uprising of 1568–71.

The sacking of Gao marked the effective end of the Songhai as a regional power and its economic and intellectual decline. The increasing trans-Atlantic trade, which transported African slaves, including leaders and scholars of Timbuktu, marginalised Gao and Timbuktu's roles as trade and scholarly centers. The Moroccan expedition resulted in the formation of the Pashalik of Timbuktu. While initially controlling the Morocco – Timbuktu trade routes, Morocco soon cut its ties with the Arma. Subsequent pashas lost their grip on Timbuktu. By 1630, the colony was independent and the leadership had become indigenised through intermarriage and local alliances. Songhay never regained control and smaller taifa kingdoms were created.

The Tuareg temporarily took control in 1737. During the remainder of the 18th century, various Tuareg tribes, Bambara and Kounta briefly occupied or besieged the city. During this period, the influence of the Pashas, who by then had mixed with the Songhay through intermarriage, never completely disappeared.

The Massina Empire took control of Timbuktu in 1826, holding it until 1865, when they were driven away by El Hadj Umar Tall's Toucouleur Empire. Sources conflict on who was in control when the French colonizers arrived: a 1924 article in the Journal of the Royal African Society mentions the Tuareg, the historian Elias N. Saad in 1983 suggests the Soninke Wangara, while the Africanist John Hunwick wrote in 2003 that several states competed for power 'in a shadowy way' until 1893.

Under French rule

After European powers formalized the scramble for Africa in the Berlin Conference, the French assumed control of the land between the 14th meridian and Miltou, South-West Chad, bounded in the south by a line running from Say, Niger to Baroua. Although the Azawad region was French in name, the principle of effectivity required France to hold power in those areas assigned, e.g. by signing agreements with local chiefs, setting up a government, and making use of the area economically, before the claim would be definitive. On 15 December 1893, Timbuktu, by then long past its prime, was annexed by a small group of French soldiers, led by Lieutenant Gaston Boiteux. The region became part of French Sudan (Soudan Français), a colony of France. The colony was reorganised and the name changed several times during the French colonial period. In 1899 the French Sudan was subdivided and the Azawad became part of Upper Senegal and Middle Niger (Haut-Sénégal et Moyen Niger). In 1902 it was renamed as Senegambia and Niger (Sénégambie et Niger), and in 1904 this was changed again to Upper Senegal and Niger (Haut-Sénégal et Niger). This name was used until 1920 when it became French Sudan again.

Under Malian rule

French Sudan became the autonomous state of Mali within the French Community in 1958, and Mali became independent from France in 1960. Four major Tuareg rebellions took place against Malian rule: the First Tuareg Rebellion (1962–64), the rebellion of 1990–1995, the rebellion of 2007–2009, and a 2012 rebellion.

In the early twenty-first century, the region became notorious for banditry and drug smuggling. The area has been reported to contain great potential mineral wealth, including petroleum and uranium.

Independence War

On 17 January 2012, the MNLA announced the start of an insurrection in Northern Mali against central government, declaring that it "will continue so long as Bamako does not recognise this territory as a separate entity". After the first attack took place in the town of Ménaka, further fighting was reported in different parts of the north, including Aguelhok, Tessalit, Léré, and Niafunké. Contradictory reports on military gains and losses from Malian military, were strongly denied by the Malian government. On 24 January, the MNLA won control of the town of Aguelhok, killing around 160 Malian soldiers and capturing dozens of heavy weapons and military vehicles. In March 2012, the MNLA and Ansar Dine took control of the regional capitals of Kidal and Gao along with their military bases. On 1 April, Timbuktu was captured. After the seizure of Timbuktu on 1 April, the MNLA gained effective control of most of the territory they claim for an independent Azawad. In a statement released on the occasion, the MNLA invited all Tuaregs abroad to return home and join in constructing institutions in the new state.

Unilateral declaration of independence

The National Movement for the Liberation of Azawad (MNLA) declared Northern Mali an independent state that they named Azawad on 6 April 2012 and pledged to draft a constitution establishing it as a democracy. Their statement acknowledged the United Nations charter and said the new state would uphold its principles.

In an interview with France 24, an MNLA spokesman declared the independence of Azawad:

In the same interview, Assarid promised that they would respect the colonial frontiers that separate the region from its neighbours; he insisted that Azawad's declaration of independence had international legality.

No foreign entity recognised Azawad. The MNLA's declaration was immediately rejected by the African Union, who declared it "null and no value whatsoever". The French Foreign Ministry said it would not recognise the unilateral partition of Mali, but it called for negotiations between the two entities to address "the demands of the northern Tuareg population [which] are old and for too long had not received adequate and necessary responses". The United States also rejected the declaration of independence.

The MNLA is estimated to have up to 3,000 soldiers. ECOWAS declared Azawad "null and void", and said that Mali is "one and [an] indivisible entity". ECOWAS has said that it would use force, if necessary, to put down the rebellion. The French government indicated it could provide logistical support.

On 26 May, the MNLA and its former co-belligerent Ansar Dine announced a pact to merge to form an Islamist state. Later reports indicated the MNLA withdrew from the pact, distancing itself from Ansar Dine. MNLA and Ansar Dine continued to clash, culminating in the Battle of Gao and Timbuktu on 27 June, in which the Islamist groups Movement for Oneness and Jihad in West Africa and Ansar Dine took control of Gao, driving out the MNLA. The following day, Ansar Dine announced that it was in control of Timbuktu and Kidal, the three biggest cities of northern Mali. Ansar Dine continued its offensive against MNLA positions and overran all remaining MNLA held towns by 12 July with the fall of Ansongo.

In December 2012, the MNLA agreed on Mali's national unity and territorial integrity in talks with both the central government and Ansar Dine.

Northern Mali conflict

In January 2013, a minor insurgency began when Islamist fundamentalist groups attempted to take control of all of Mali. France and Chad sent troops in support of the Malian army. The whole Northern region was captured within a month prior to the Islamists offensive against the South. The rebels' main presence centered around their headquarters in Kidal. Islamists began slowly regrouping in the Adrar des Ifoghas mountains until the French and African coalition launched an offensive to eliminate the Islamist leadership and recover foreign hostages being held by them.
Tuareg nomadic groups such as the MNLA, an Azawadi separatist group, helped retake several main towns in the North, but stayed neutral in fighting between the Islamists and the Malian army. The MNLA co-operated with the French troops, providing guides and logistical services and renting space in their military bases. However, no Malian army presence was allowed by MNLA authorities, due to accusations of Malian crimes against the Tuareg people. Despite this, the Islamists targeted MNLA checkpoints and other military installations with suicide bombers in retaliation. In-fighting also occurred when Chadian intervention forces were accused of firing upon Tuareg civilians.

Peace deal
A peace deal was reached in June 2013 between the MNLA and Malian government giving military lease over Tuareg rebel held land also, Tuareg greater autonomy which was requested after the MNLA revoked their Independence claim. This allowed the North to participate in Malian presidential elections the same month. The ceasefire didn't last long before Malian troops clashed with rebels in skirmishes.

Continued insurgency
In February 2014, a massacre of a Malian general's family who were ethnic Tuareg led to an ethnic conflict between Fulani Islamists and Tuareg MNLA separatists. A massacre deliberately targeting Tuareg majority civilians was carried out by Islamists killing over 30 unarmed men.

2017
There was a referendum scheduled for 2017 on gaining autonomy and renaming the northern regions into "Azawad". However, Mali's President Ibrahim Boubacar Keita shelved the plans for the referendum on constitutional reforms that were met with opposition and ignited regular street protests.

Geography

The local climate is desert or semi-desert. Reuters wrote of the terrain: "Much of the land is the Sahara desert at its most inhospitable: rock, sand dunes and dust scored by shifting tracks." Some definitions of Azawad also include parts of northern Niger and southern Algeria, adjacent areas to the south and the north though in its declaration of independence, the MNLA did not advance territorial claims on those areas.

Traditionally, Azawad has referred to the sandplains north of Timbuktu. In geological terms, it is a mosaic of river, swamp, lake, and wind-borne deposits, while aeolian processes have proven the most imprinting.

About 6500 BC, Azawad was a 90,000-square kilometres marshy and lake basin. The area of today's Timbuktu was probably permanently flooded. In the deeper parts of Azawad, there were large lakes, partly recharged by rainfall, partly by exposed groundwater. Seasonal lakes and creeks were fed by overflow of the Niger River. The annual Niger flood was diffused throughout the Azawad by a network of palaeochannels spread out over an area of 180 by 130 kilometres. The most important of these paleochannels is the Wadi el-Ahmar, which is 1 200 metres wide at its southern end, at the Niger bend, and winds 70 to 100 kilometres northward. These long interdunal indentations that are framed by Pleistocene longitudinal dunes, characterise the present landscape.

Politics

The MNLA in its declaration of independence announced the first political institutions of the state of Azawad. It included:
 An executive committee, directed by Mahmoud Ag Aghaly.
 A revolutionary council, directed by Abdelkrim Ag Tahar.
 A consultative council, directed by Mahamed Ag Tahadou.
 The general staff of the Liberation Army, directed by Mohamed Ag Najem.

Although the MNLA claimed responsibility for managing the country "until the appointment of a national authority" in their declaration of independence, it has acknowledged the presence of rival armed groups in the region, including Islamist fighters under Ansar Dine, the Movement for Oneness and Jihad in West Africa, and Al Qaeda in the Islamic Maghreb (AQIM). The MNLA did not establish a formal government, though it pledged to draft a constitution establishing Azawad as a democracy. The main government building is called the Palace of Azawad by the MNLA. It is a heavily guarded building in central Gao that served as the office of the Gao Region's governor prior to the rebellion.

The military wing of Ansar Dine rejected the MNLA's declaration of independence hours after it was issued. Ansar Dine vowed to establish Islamic sharia law over all of Mali. At a conference, the Azawadis voiced their disapproval of radical Islamic groups, and asked all foreign fighters to disarm and leave the country.

According to a Chatham House Africa expert, Mali was not to be considered "definitively partitioned". The peoples who constitute a major share of the population of northern Mali, such as Songhai and Fulani, considered themselves to be Malian and had no interest in a separate Tuareg-dominated state. On the day of the declaration of independence, about 200 Malian northerners staged a rally in Bamako, declaring their rejection of the partition and their willingness to fight to drive out the rebels. A day later, 2,000 protesters joined a new rally against separatism.

According to Ramtane Lamamra, the African Union's peace and security commissioner, the African Union has discussed sending a military force to reunify Mali. He said that negotiations with terrorists had been ruled out, but negotiations with other armed factions were still open.

Administrative divisions
Azawad, as proclaimed by the MNLA, includes the regions of Gao, Timbuktu, Kidal, and the northeast half of Mopti; until 1991, when the new Kidal Region was created, it formed the northern portion of Gao Region. As such, it includes the three biggest cities of Timbuktu, Gao and Kidal.

Demographics

Northern Mali has a population density of 1.5 people per square kilometre. The Malian regions claimed by Azawad are listed hereafter (apart from the portion of Mopti Region claimed and occupied by the MNLA). The population figures are from the 2009 census of Mali, taken before Azawadi independence was proclaimed. Since the start of the Tuareg rebellion in January 2012, an estimated 250,000 former inhabitants have fled the territory.

Ethnic groups
The area was traditionally inhabited by the settled Songhay, and the nomadic Tuareg, Arabs, and Fulas. The ethnic composition of the regions in 1950 (at that time, Kidal Region was a part of Gao Region) and in 2009 is shown in the adjacent diagrams.

Languages

The languages of Northern Mali include Hassaniya Arabic, Fulfulde and Songhay, Tamashek. French, though not spoken natively, is widely used as a lingua franca, as well as negotiations with the government of Mali and foreign affairs.

Religion
Most are Muslims, of the Sunni orientations. Most popular in the Tuareg movement and northern Mali as a whole is the Maliki branch of Sunnism, in which traditional opinions and analogical reasoning by later Muslim scholars are often used instead of a strict reliance on hadith as a basis for legal judgment.

Ansar Dine follows the Salafi branch of Sunni Islam. They strongly object to praying around the graves of Malikite 'holymen', and burned down an ancient Sufi shrine in Timbuktu, which had been listed as a UNESCO World Heritage Site.

Most of the 300 Christians who formerly lived in Timbuktu have fled to the South since the rebels captured the town on 2 April 2012.

Humanitarian situation
The people living in the central and northern Sahelian and Sahelo-Saharan areas of Mali are the country's poorest, according to an International Fund for Agricultural Development report. Most are pastoralists and farmers practicing subsistence agriculture on dry land with poor and increasingly degraded soils. The northern part of Mali suffers from a critical shortage of food and lack of health care. Starvation has prompted about 200,000 inhabitants to leave the region.

Refugees in the 92,000-person refugee camp at Mbera, Mauritania, described the Islamists as "intent on imposing an Islam of lash and gun on Malian Muslims." The Islamists in Timbuktu have destroyed about a half-dozen historic above-ground tombs of revered holy men, proclaiming the tombs contrary to Shariah. One refugee in the camp spoke of encountering Afghans, Pakistanis and Nigerians among the invading forces.

See also

 Arab Islamic Front of Azawad
 Ansar Dine
 Arab Movement of Azawad
 Azawadi declaration of independence
 Jama'at Nasr al-Islam wal Muslimin
 Niger Movement for Justice
 Northern Mali conflict
 Popular Movement for the Liberation of Azawad
 Tuareg rebellion (1962–1964)
 Tuareg rebellion (1990–1995)
 Tuareg rebellion (2007–2009)
 Tuareg rebellion (2012)

References

Bibliography
 Baldaro, E., & Raineri, L. (2020). "Azawad: A Parastate Between Nomads and Mujahidins?" Nationalities Papers, 48(1), 100–115.
.
 
 . Also available from Gallica.
 .
 .
 .
 .
 
 
 .

External links

Orphans of the Sahara, a three-part documentary series about the Tuareg people of the Sahara desert.

 
Tuareg
Territorial disputes of Mali
Separatism in Mali
Disputed territories in Africa
Arabic-speaking countries and territories
States and territories established in 2012
Azawad
Islamic states
2012 establishments in Mali
Former unrecognized countries
States and territories disestablished in 2013